James 'Jiggy' Gornall (born 8 July 1984 in Nottingham) is a British racing driver, who has competed in the British Touring Car Championship, last for Bristol Street Motors with Excelr8 TradePriceCars.com in 2022. He won the 2019 Mini Challenge UK, and the 2008 British GT Championship.

Personal life 
James Gornall spent much of his early life in Peterborough, Cambridgeshire, and now resides near Bedford, Bedfordshire. He was educated at Arthur Mellows Village College and obtained a BA(Hons) from Oxford Brookes University in Business Management.

James is a driver coach and holds an 'A' Grade ARDS instructor licence. He was previously the Head of Sales & Marketing at Aero Tec Laboratories, Head of Motorsport at Ellis Clowes and Championship Coordinator at the MSV FIA Formula Two Championship.

Racing career 
In 2019 James became a full Member of the British Racing Drivers' Club.

Karting 
James began kart racing in 1995 in the Comer Cadet class. In 1996 he moved into Formula Junior TKM, finishing 3rd in the 1999 Super One National Championship. In 2000 James moved into the Formula TKM Championship and in 2001 James won the Super One National Championship. For 2002 James stepped up to the Intercontinental A class, finishing 6th in the Super One National Championship and he also took part in the European Championship.

During his time at Oxford Brookes University, James was part of the British University Karting Championship Team. The team, James included, won the 2003–2004, 2004-2005 and 2005-2006 championships.

BARC Formula Renault 
2003 was James's first season of car racing, stepping up to the BARC Formula Renault Championship with JA Motorsport in the Van Diemen RF98/99. James won the championship at his first attempt.

UK Formula Renault 
In 2004 James and the JA Motorsport team continued their relationship to enter the Formula Renault UK Championship which supported the British Touring Car Championship. Following the Croft race weekend James was forced to withdraw from the championship due to lack of funds.

British GT 
James's first foray in British GT was the final round of the 2007 Championship with Team Trimite Brookspeed in the Dodge Viper Competition Coupe, partnering Italian Michelangelo Segatori.

For 2008 James continued with Team Trimite Brookspeed, once again in the Dodge Viper Competition Coupe, partnering Jon Barnes. James and Jon won 4 races, stepping on the podium a total of 8 times on their way to winning the championship at the Brands Hatch event in July.

24hr Racing 
James was invited during 2008 to race with Beechdean Motorsport in their Aston Martin N24 at the Silverstone 24hrs. James was joined by Andrew Howard, Neil Cunningham and Jamie Smythe. The team took 2nd place overall, winning class 2.

BMW Compact Cup 
James competed in the BMW Compact cup from 2015–2017. He came 2nd in 2015 and won the title in 2016.

MINI Challenge JCW 
In April 2019 James made a guest appearance at Rockingham in the MINI Challenge JCW. James drove the Dunlop guest car run by XCELR8 Motorsport. This was James's debut in a front wheel drive racing car. James then obtained a MINI JCW race car of his own and competed in the Brands Hatch GP and Donington Park events.

For 2020 James competed in his family run JIG Racing team. James won the championship, taking 5 wins and a total of 13 podiums from 17 races.

British Touring Car Championship 
For winning the 2019 MINI Challenge JCW championship James received a prize test at Snetterton in the Motorbase Ford Focus RS.

Trade Price Cars Racing (2020) 
It was announced on 9 January 2020 at the Autosport international Show that James would be joining the BTCC with Trade Price Cars Racing in their Audi S3 Saloon.

Gornall returned to the championship for a one off appearance at the Croft Circuit round of the 2022 season, filling in for Jack Butel at Bristol Street Motors with Excelr8 TradePriceCars.com.

Racing record

British GT Championship results

MINI Challenge UK JCW Results

Complete British Touring Car Championship results
(key) Races in bold indicate pole position (1 point awarded – 2002–2003 all races, 2004–present just in first race) Races in italics indicate fastest lap (1 point awarded all races) * signifies that driver lead race for at least one lap (1 point awarded – 2002 just in feature races, 2003–present all races)

References

External links 

 British Touring Car Championship Official Website
 James Gornall Official Website
 [./Https://www.driverdb.com/drivers/james-gornall/ James Gornall on Driver Database]

1984 births
Living people
Alumni of Oxford Brookes University
British GT Championship drivers
English racing drivers
British Touring Car Championship drivers
Britcar 24-hour drivers
Mini Challenge UK drivers
Formula Renault BARC drivers